The RAF Staff College at Bracknell was a Royal Air Force staff college active for most of the second half of the 20th century. Its role was the training of staff officers in the administrative, staff and policy aspects of air force matters. Its motto was Visu et Nisu which is Latin for by vision and effort. The equivalent in the British Army was the Staff College, Camberley and the equivalent in the Royal Navy was the Royal Naval Staff College, Greenwich.

History
Ramslade House was built as suburban-style villa in 1840 and then substantially re-modelled by Lieutenant Colonel Frederick Mackenzie in 1895. The house became the headquarters for Second Tactical Air Force in 1943 during the Second World War.

The Staff College at Bracknell was formed by transferring a major portion of the Staff College at Bulstrode Park to Ramslade House in July 1945. Air Vice-Marshal Ronald Graham, the then Commandant at Bulstrode Park, became the first commandant at Bracknell.

On 1 May 1946 the Staff College was placed under the control of Reserve Command.  Four years later, on 1 August 1950, that command was renamed Home Command.  It was subsequently transferred to Training Command on 1 June 1968 and then transferred again to RAF Support Command on 13 June 1973.  The final transfer came on 1 April 1994 when the Staff College was transferred to Personnel and Training Command but this arrangement was short-lived as the College closed on 1 January 1997 when RAF staff training responsibilities were transferred to the newly established Joint Services Command and Staff College which was initially located on the same site at Bracknell but later moved to Shrivenham. Defence Estates disposed of the site in 2004, selling it to English Partnerships, a regeneration agency.

Commandants
Commandants include:
July 1945 Air Vice-Marshal R Graham
December 1945 Air Vice-Marshal A P M Sanders
1947 Air Vice-Marshal T M Williams
1 January 1949 Air Vice-Marshal J D I Hardman
18 June 1951 Air Vice-Marshal A D Gillmore
1953 Air Vice-Marshal D Macfadyen
April 1956 Air Vice-Marshal D H F Barnett
1 August 1956 Air Vice-Marshal R Faville
1 January 1957 Air Vice-Marshal S C Elworthy
1 December 1959 Air Vice-Marshal M L Heath
1 January 1962 Air Vice-Marshal D J P Lee
1 January 1965 Air Vice-Marshal T W Piper
1 June 1966 Air Vice-Marshal D C Stapleton
22 April 1968 Air Vice-Marshal N M Maynard
27 September 1970 Air Vice-Marshal M J Beetham
2 October 1972  Air Vice-Marshal A McK S Steedman
16 August 1975 Air Vice-Marshal K A Williamson
23 February 1977 Air Vice-Marshal J B Curtiss
27 February 1980 Air Vice-Marshal M Beavis
21 April 1981 Air Vice-Marshal D G Parry-Evans
29 January 1983  Air Vice-Marshal A G Skingsley
29 September 1984 Air Vice-Marshal G A White
9 February 1987 Air Vice-Marshal D T Bryant
6 January 1989 Air Vice-Marshal A F C Hunter
8 August 1990 Air Vice-Marshal R G Peters
5 May 1993 Air Vice-Marshal M P Donaldson
15 January 1996 Air Vice-Marshal M van Der Veen

References

1945 establishments in the United Kingdom
Bracknell
Education in Bracknell Forest
Educational institutions disestablished in 1997
Staff colleges
Staff College
1997 disestablishments in England